Cécile Crochon, better known by the stage name Cécile Cassel (born 25 June 1982), is a French actress and singer. Since 2002, she has appeared in a number of films and television series. She is also a recording artist using the stage name HollySiz.

Biography
She is the half-sister of actor Vincent Cassel and MC Mathias Cassel, and the daughter of Jean-Pierre Cassel. She has been in relationships with the French actor Gaspard Ulliel and the music producer Raphaël Hamburger.

Discography

Albums

Singles

*Did not appear in the official Belgian Ultratop 50 charts, but rather in the bubbling under Ultratip charts.

Filmography
La Bande du drugstore (2002), of François Armanet : Charlotte Stroessman
Vivante (2002), of Sandrine Ray : Isa
A l'abri des regards indiscrets (2002), of Ruben Alves
Nous étions libres (2004), of John Duigan : Céline Bessé
Pour le plaisir (2004), of Dominique Deruddere : Mireille
Foon (2005), of 
Ma vie en l'air (2005), of Rémi Bezançon : Clémence
Contre-sens (2005), of Pierre-Alfred Richard
Ô Jérusalem (2006), of Elie Chouraqui : Jane
Les Amours d'Astrée et de Céladon (2007), of Éric Rohmer :  Léonide
Le Premier Jour du Reste de ta Vie (2008), of Rémi Bezançon : Prune
Barbarossa (2009), Beatrice I, Countess of Burgundy
Je vais te manquer (2009), Anna
Toi, moi, les autres (2010), Alexandra
Nuit bleue (2010), Antonia

Television
2003 : Sex and the City (Season 6, episode 19) : Chloé
2007 : Les Mariées de l'isle Bourbon of Euzhan Palcy
2007 : Clara Sheller, de Alain Berliner

References

External links
 

1982 births
Living people
21st-century French actresses
French film actresses
French television actresses
Actresses from Paris
21st-century French singers
21st-century French women singers